Lake Bogoria (formerly Lake Hannington) is a saline, alkaline lake that lies in a volcanic region in a half-graben basin south of Lake Baringo, Kenya, a little north of the equator. Lake Bogoria, like Lake Nakuru, Lake Elementeita, and Lake Magadi further south in the Rift Valley, and Lake Logipi to the north, is home at times to one of the world's largest populations of lesser flamingos. The lake is a Ramsar site and Lake Bogoria National Reserve has been a protected National Reserve since November 29, 1973. Lake Bogoria is shallow (about 10 m depth), and is about 34 km long by 3.5 km wide, with a drainage basin of 700 km2. It is Located in Baringo County.

Local features include the Kesubo Swamp to the north and the Siracho Escarpment to the east, both within the National Reserve. The lake is also famous for geysers and hot springs along the bank of the lake and in the lake. In four locations around the lake can be observed at least 10 geysers, which erupt up to 5 m high. Geyser activity is affected by the fluctuations of lake level, which may inundate or expose some geysers.

Chemistry and ecology
The lake waters contain large concentrations of Na+, HCO3− and CO32− ions. They originate from inflow from the Sandai and Emsos rivers, and from about 200 alkaline hot springs that are present at three onshore sites: Loburu, Chemurkeu, and a southern group (Ng'wasis, Koibobei, Losaramat). Other springs discharge directly from the lake floor. Lake Bogoria also contains the highest concentration of true geysers in Africa (at least 18 are known). The lake waters are alkaline (pH:10.5) and saline (up to 100 g/L total dissolved salts). The lake has no surface outlet so the water becomes saline mainly through evaporation, which is high in this semi-arid region. The lake itself is meromictic (stratified) with less dense surface waters lying on a denser more saline bottom waters. Although hypersaline, the lake is highly productive with abundant cyanobacteria (Arthrospira fusiformis) that feed the flamingoes, but few other organisms inhabit the lake e.g. the monogonont rotifer species Brachionus sp. Austria (belonging to the Brachionus plicatilis cryptic species complex) is found in high densities.

The lake has not always been saline. Sediment cores from the lake floor have shown that freshwater conditions existed for several periods during the past 10 000 years, and that lake level was up to 9 m higher than its present elevation of about 990 m. At times it might have overflowed northward towards Lake Baringo. At times, during the late Pleistocene it might have been united with a larger precursor of modern Lake Baringo, but this is still uncertain.

History
The lake was formerly named after Bishop James Hannington who visited in 1885.

The lake area was the traditional home of the Endorois people, who were forced to leave the area in the 1970s and are now challenging their removal at the African Commission on Human and Peoples' Rights.

Accommodations
Hotel accommodation is available near Loboi village at the north end of the lake. Camping is permitted at the southern end of the lake (see North Lewis, 1998, for details).

See also 
 Rift Valley Lakes
 East African Rift
 Rivers of Kenya

References 

 Tiercelin, J.J. and Vincens, A. (Eds) 1987. Le demi–graben de Baringo–Bogoria, Rift Gregory, Kenya: 30,000 ans d’histoire hydrologique et sédimentaire. Bulletin des Centres de Recherches Exploration-Production Elf-Aquitaine, v. 11, p. 249–540.
 Renaut, R.W. and Tiercelin, J.-J. 1993. Lake Bogoria, Kenya: soda, hot springs and about a million flamingoes. Geology Today, v. 9, p. 56-61.
 Renaut, R.W. and Tiercelin, J.-J. 1994. Lake Bogoria, Kenya Rift Valley: a sedimentological overview. In: Sedimentology and Geochemistry of Modern and Ancient Saline Lakes. (Eds R.W. Renaut and W.M. Last), SEPM Special Publication, v. 50, p. 101–123.
 North Lewis, M. 1998. A Guide to Lake Baringo and Lake Bogoria. Horizon Books.
 Harper, D.M., Childress, R.B.. Harper, M.M., Boar, R.R., Hickley, P., Mills, S.C., Otieno, N., Drane, T., Vareschi, E., Nasirwa, O.1, Mwatha, W.E., Darlington, J.P.E.C., and Escuté-Gasulla, X. 2003. Aquatic biodiversity and saline lakes: Lake Bogoria National Reserve, Kenya. Hydrobiologia, v. 500, p. 259-276.
 Renaut, R.W. and Owen, R.B. 2005. The geysers of Lake Bogoria, Kenya Rift Valley, Africa. GOSA Transactions, v. 9, 4–18.

External links 
 Minority Rights Group on the Endorois and Lake Bogoria

Meromictic lakes
Lakes of Kenya
Ramsar sites in Kenya
Saline lakes of the Great Rift Valley
World Heritage Sites in Kenya
Baringo County
Tourist attractions in Rift Valley Province
Landforms of Rift Valley Province